Limnonectes palavanensis (common names: smooth guardian frog, Palawan wart frog) is a species of frog in the family Dicroglossidae. It is found in the Palawan Island (the Philippines, its type locality) and in Borneo (Brunei, Indonesia, Malaysia). The species shows paternal care, a relatively rare trait in frogs.

Description
There is a V-shaped ridge between the shoulders, and a sharp interorbital band that separates the anterior part of the head from differently colorer back. Juveniles have a medial vertebral stripe that in some populations persists in adults too.

The tadpole is moderately flat (dorsoventrally compressed). The tail is twice the length of the body. The tail fin is low and ends in a pointed tip.

Reproduction
The male of this species guard the tadpoles that hatch from the eggs laid on the ground. The male then carries the tadpoles on its back to water.

Habitat and conservation
Its natural habitats are lower montane and lowland forests. The tadpoles develop in small rain pools and quiet sections of small, slow moving streams.

The habitat of this species is mostly well protected, although it can potentially be impacted by habitat loss. It occurs in the Crocker Range National Park.

References

palavanensis
Amphibians of Borneo
Fauna of Brunei
Amphibians of Indonesia
Amphibians of Malaysia
Amphibians of the Philippines
Taxa named by George Albert Boulenger
Amphibians described in 1894
Taxonomy articles created by Polbot